Auchē is a village in Mongyaung Township in Myitkyina District in the Kachin State of north-eastern Burma.

Nearby towns and villages include Nawia (2.1 nm), Hpaochan (2.7 nm), Namkwi (13.7 nm), Maitaung (1.3 nm) and Namponmao (15.0 nm).

References

External links
 Satellite map at Maplandia.com

Populated places in Kachin State